Burkhard was the first margrave in the Bavarian marchia orientalis, the territory that was to become the March of Austria, after its recapture at the 955 Battle of Lechfeld.

When German king Otto I had defeated the Magyars, the marchia was re-established in the conquered territories and put under the command of Burkhard, a brother-in-law of Duchess Judith, Duchess of Bavaria. As he had joined the uprising of Duke Henry II of Bavaria against Emperor Otto II, he was deposed at the Reichstag of Regensburg in 976, when the territory was given to Leopold of Babenberg.

Next to nothing is known about him. He is also considered the father of Bishop Henry I of Augsburg.

The German name for Austria was only first mentioned as Ostarrichi in a famous document of 996.

See also
March of Pannonia
Leopold I, Margrave of Austria
List of rulers of Austria

References
Medieval Lands Project: Nobility of Austria.

10th-century margraves of Austria
Year of birth unknown
Year of death unknown